Velapur is a village in Kopargaon taluka (tahsil), Ahmednagar district, Maharashtra, India. Its Pincode is 423602. Its STD code is 02423.

Agriculture

Most people of Velapur are farmers. Popular crops are sugarcane, wheat, and onions.

References 

Villages in Ahmednagar district